Onga may refer to:

Onga District, Fukuoka, a district of Fukuoka Prefecture, Japan
Onga, Fukuoka, a town in that district
Onga, Hungary, a town
Onga, Gabon, in the department of Djoue

See also 
 
 Oonga (disambiguation)
 Ounga (disambiguation)
 Ongaonga (disambiguation)